Monkey (also known as The Monkey, ITV Digital Monkey or PG Tips Monkey, and often pronounced  in imitation of Johnny Vegas' Lancashire accent), is an animated puppet advertising character in the form of a knitted sock monkey. He was first produced by The Jim Henson Company via their UK Creature Shop, puppeteered by Nigel Plaskitt and Susan Beattie and voiced by comedian Ben Miller.

Monkey has appeared in advertising campaigns in the United Kingdom for both the defunct television company ITV Digital and the tea brand PG Tips, as well as being occasionally featured in TV programmes. Monkey is notable as one of a small number of advertising characters to eclipse the popularity of the product they advertise and also to be reused to advertise a completely different product.

ITV Digital
A series of high-profile adverts for ITV Digital featured the laid-back, droll and composed Monkey (in a variety of T-shirts) playing the straight man to the comedian Johnny Vegas's womaniser of a character "Al". Monkey was one of the few positive public relations successes of ITV Digital. Purchasers of ITV Digital were sent a free soft toy Monkey with their subscription.

For a period during the advertising campaign and after ITV Digital's bankruptcy, the original promotional Monkey toys were in high demand and short supply. One sold for £150 at the bankruptcy auction and they were selling for several hundred pounds on eBay, where customers could also find replica Monkey knitting patterns delivered by email selling for several pounds. Later, The Gadget Shop purchased the remaining promotional toys from ITV Digital's liquidators and sold them through their retail stores. These saw a boost in popularity after an appearance in the second series of award-winning British sitcom The Office.

Legal dispute
As Monkey was created and owned by advertising agency Mother rather than by ITV Digital itself, he was the subject of a legal dispute as both claimed the rights to the character. This prevented his use for some time, despite many organisations being keen to acquire the rights. The dispute was eventually resolved by both parties agreeing to donate the intellectual property rights for Monkey to Comic Relief. Following the resolution of the dispute, Monkey appeared in a few TV shows, with the BBC using him for 2001's Comic Relief, as well as making a guest appearance at the 2002 BRIT Awards. In both cases Monkey appeared without Johnny Vegas. In 2003, the BBC commissioned a variety show to be hosted by Monkey. A pilot was filmed titled "Watch with Monkey" and featured Dawn French and the Ukulele Orchestra of Great Britain. The pilot has never been televised.

PG Tips

In January 2007, Monkey and Vegas reprised their double act in a new series of advertisements for PG Tips tea. The first advertisement was named "The Return"  and the adverts make reference to PG Tips' popular series of adverts featuring live chimps which ran between 1956 and 2002, as well as to ITV Digital going out of business (on which low audience figures, piracy issues and an ultimately unaffordable multi-million pound deal with the Football League led to the broadcaster suffering massive losses, forcing it to enter administration in March 2002).

PG launched a website selling the newly branded "PG Monkey" merchandise with profits being donated to Comic Relief, who still own the intellectual property rights. The online shop has since closed but during promotions PG Tips have given away free mini-Monkeys packaged with their tea.

Mini movie
Monkey also appeared in a short advertising film which was shown in cinemas at the beginning of selected showings of Horton Hears a Who, The Spiderwick Chronicles, Hannah Montana 3D and The Game Plan. The film was released on 21 March 2008. The film is called A Tale of Two Continents and has Monkey portraying various historical figures as he attempts to make the perfect cup of tea in the Kenya tea farms and then safely take it across the world to England for The Queen. The film was also given away on DVD with special packs of PG Tips tea.

Characteristics

Early life
In Monkey - Hero of Our Time, Monkey writes that his "parents owned a toy shop"; however, this was forced into closure in '1982'. He said "[a]s my parents were clearing away and throwing out what was left of the stock, my mother came across me, stuck behind a pile of empty cardboard boxes" and "[s]he took me home and painstakingly restored me back to my former glory - cleaning me, re-stuffing me and sewing me up. Her love for me was so great that I amazingly found myself able to move and speak." Soon afterwards he claimed that his first words to her were "Put the kettle on, eh Mum? I'm parched.".

Personality and habits
Monkey is sometimes portrayed as being quite cowardly; for example his refusal to take responsibility for dropping a ceramic bowl dating back to 3000 BC, despite being filmed doing so. He is also prone to miserliness, having admitted that he re-uses discarded plasters he finds in swimming pools. Monkey hoards both his and Al's wages, deliberately neglecting to inform the naive Al of the fact that they are in fact paid for their work, stating "I don't bother Al with details" and that his money is "safely invested in a portfolio of bananas". Despite his turbulent relationship with Al, the two share the same bed.
Monkey is shown to be very passionate about tea, his favourite serving method being "three stirs clockwise, two stirs back, one and three quarters sugars". He vehemently insists that tea bags should precede milk when brewing.
His exact species is never clarified; Monkey himself denies being a chimpanzee (the CHimp logo on his tea-shirt puns on CH sounding like the Chinese word for tea), and his response to Al's idea that he may be "half monkey-half chimp" is limited to "speak for yourself". Though he claims to be a "ladies' monkey", he is caught by Al surfing dating sites, giving exaggerated descriptions of his physical appearance.
He is sometimes shown wearing a woman's nightcap, a sheath dress and a ballet tutu. He gets distressed if tea is made in the wrong order.

References

External links
Official PG Tips Website
Kit containing Sirdar pattern and yarn for knitting Monkey
"BBC show for ITV Digital monkey (November 2003)"

ITV (TV network)
Advertising characters
Male characters in advertising
British comedy puppets
Advertising in the United Kingdom
Comic Relief
Primate mascots
Fictional monkeys